Kalleh Kub (also Romanized as Kalleh Kūb; also known as Kalleh Kūh) is a village in Dastjerd Rural District, Alamut-e Gharbi District, Qazvin County, Qazvin Province, Iran. At the 2006 census, its population was 39, in 7 families.

References 

Populated places in Qazvin County